The Don whitefin gudgeon (Romanogobio tanaiticus)  is a species of freshwater fish in the family Cyprinidae. It is distributed in the Don River basin in Russia, and also in the Siverskyi Donets River in Ukraine. The maximal length is 10.7 cm, maximal reported age 5 years.

References

Sources
 

Romanogobio
Freshwater fish of Europe

Fish of Russia
Fish described in 2001